The Our Lady of the Visitation of Guibang (Spanish: Nuestra Señora de la Visitación de Guibang), is a 20th-century Roman Catholic icon enshrined in the town of Gamu in the province of Isabela, Philippines. It is considered to be one of the most venerated Marian images in northern Philippines. The statue was episcopally crowned by the Most Rev. Carmine Pocco, Papal Nuncio to the Philippines on 26 May 1973

History

Origin

The origins of the Virgin of Guibang can be traced to 1905, when a young man found the image floating near the riverbank of Barrio Guibang in Gamu, Isabela - providential catch to be exact. At that time, he brought the image to the hut of a poor couple, Francisco Noble and Maria Noble. The young man asked the couple to pray the Rosary and offer good works of mercy in honor of the Virgin through this mysterious yet lovely image and sometime later, the couple's prayers were granted.

The Image

The image of the Virgin of the Visitation is that of the typical Madonna and Child model in a classic Philippine Colonial aesthetic: the  de bastidor body and imperial ensemble consists of a beautifully beaded, oftentimes embroidered vestments, a cape and a set of crowns, a rostrillo, Doce Estrellas and a scepter for the Virgin. The Virgin at times wears a veil and some times, she does not wear one and both Mother and Child are carved in a very Filipino looking features.

The image was said to be a replica of the Virgin of the Visitation of Piat hence, they share the same feast day - 2nd of July.

Miracles

As if the providential find of the image of the Virgin and the immediate response to the supplication of the Noble couple to her, God might have a grand design to place Isabela province to the Patronage of Our Lady. On one occasion, the couple wanted to bring the image with them on a journey, but the image became too heavy to be carried. They took it as a sign that Our Lady wished not to be moved to a different location and she wanted to stay in Guibang.

A few days after, the young man who brought them the image was able to carry it and brought it from house so that the devotion to her may be propagated. When it was a pious couple's turn to receive the image in their house, they were reluctant because they can't afford to give alms for the image's visit due to poverty. Nonetheless, they eventually welcomed her to their humble abode. On the night of the visit, the couple were amazed by the smell of sweet fragrance that filled the household. They found out that the fragrance exuded from the image. The news about how the prodigies of the image spread like wildfire in the whole town. From then on, the image of the Lady of the Visitation became popularly known as the Lady of Guibang. As devotion grew and the visit of pilgrims from other towns and villages became more frequent, a chapel was built for her to accommodate more pilgrims who flock Isabela province to pay homage and ask for her intercession.

Other miracles that were duly recorded that were also attributed to the intercession of the Virgin of Guibang. One of the most notable was devotees and residents of the area attests that the Virgin is making her presence felt by the strong scent of sampaguita flowers and it is said that the phenomenon continues to this day. Devotees would also attest that the Virgin is also making nocturnal visits to her devotees that oftentimes, amorseco burs are found sticking in the dress of the Virgin.

On one occasion, at the midnight of 8 September 1972, people were awakened by the loud sounds of bells that seemed to come from the direction of the shrine. However, when the people came to investigate, the parish priest at that time denied that he rang the bells and he had no recollection that he rang the bells on that day.

With numerous miracles that continuously being reported and attested by her devotees for decades, the image was granted the honor of episcopal coronation on 23 May 1973 as closing of the Diocesan Marian Congress of that same year. The simple chapel dedicated to the Virgin of Guibang was later elevated to a National Shrine on 13 February 1986.

Many devotees continue to flock her simple shrine in Guibang and continued to experience more miracles from different illnesses and answered petitions through the intercession of the Virgin of Guibang up to this day. The love and devotion of the people of Isabela to Virgin proves that she is truly the Queen and Mother of Isabela Province.

References

Christian iconography